Paris Football Club, commonly referred to as Paris FC or simply PFC, is a French professional football club based in Paris, that competes in the Ligue 2, the second tier of French football. Paris FC play their home matches at the Stade Charléty, which is located in the 13th arrondissement of Paris.

Founded in 1969, the club merged with Stade Saint-Germain to form Paris Saint-Germain in 1970. In 1972, the club split from Paris Saint-Germain resulting in the current Paris FC. Unlike its counterpart, which has gone on to establish a solid foundation, Paris FC has struggled to establish itself, having spent the majority of its existence playing in the amateur divisions. The club's highest honour to date was winning its group in the Championnat de France amateur in 2006. Paris FC last played in Ligue 1 in the 1978–79 season.

Though Paris FC have struggled domestically, the club has served as a springboard for several youth players who have gone on to have successful professional careers. Notable players who started their careers at the club includes Jean-Christophe Thouvenel, Mamadou Sakho, Tijani Belaid, Aymen Belaïd, Gabriel Obertan and Ibrahima Konaté. Sakho, Konaté,  and the Belaïd brothers have since become senior internationals for their respective national teams, while Thouvenel went on to win a gold medal at the 1984 Summer Olympics. Manager Roger Lemerre started his managerial career with the club before leading France to titles at UEFA Euro 2000 and the 2001 FIFA Confederations Cup.

History 

In an effort to re-launch professional football in the city of Paris, Paris Football Club was founded on 1 August 1969. The objective of the club was to be playing in the first division by 1970. An attempted merger with CS Sedan Ardennes was refused so Paris went looking in the second division and, subsequently, merged with Stade Saint-Germain to form Paris Saint-Germain, the professional club that plays in Ligue 1. The current incarnation of Paris FC came into being in 1972 when the club split from Paris Saint-Germain after coming under pressure from the capital city's mayor, who refused to support a non-Parisian club (the club had originally been situated in nearby Saint-Germain-en-Laye). As a result, a bitter split occurred and both Paris FC and Paris Saint-Germain remained as separate football club with the main agreement being that Paris FC had the right to keep the splitting entity's first division and professional status, as well as all the professional players. Paris Saint-Germain were, on the other hand, administratively relegated to the third division and given all the former entity's amateur players.

At the beginning of the 1972–73 season, Paris were playing in the first division hosting matches at the Parc des Princes. Two seasons later, the club was relegated to the second division, which coincided with Paris Saint-Germain's rise to top-flight and the acquisition of the Parc des Princes. After four years of playing in Division 2, Paris returned to the first division for the 1978–79 season. However, the season was a difficult one and resulted in the club falling back to Division 2 after one season. Paris FC have since yet to return to the top-flight league of France.

In 1983, Paris FC, then led by the industrialist Jean-Luc Lagardère, merged with Racing Club de France. While Racing remained in the first division, the remaining entity that was PFC was administratively relegated to the fourth division. Due to having limited resources, Paris fell to the Division d'Honneur after one season and, subsequently, spent four seasons in the fifth division before returning to Division 4 in 1988. Another promotion the following season saw Paris earn a place in Division 3. Paris remained in the division for 12 years becoming inaugural members of the Championnat National in the process. In 2000, the club finished 17th and were relegated to the Championnat de France amateur. Paris spent six years in the league before returning to National for the 2006–07 season. After a successful 2014–15 campaign, the club gained promotion to Ligue 2, the French second division, alongside its local rival Red Star F.C. However, it would stay in Ligue 2 for only one year and was relegated back to the Championnat National for the 2016–17 season.

In the 2016–17 season, Paris FC made the playoff/relegation final against US Orleans but lost over the two legged game on aggregate. Paris FC were then administratively promoted to Ligue 2 after SC Bastia were demoted to the third division for financial irregularities. For the 2017/2018 Ligue 2 season, Paris FC finished 8th in the table but at one stage occupied the promotion places.

In the 2018–19 season, Paris finished 4th and contested the play-offs against RC Lens, but lost the penalty shoot-out after a 1–1 draw.

On 30 April 2021 Paris FC, along with Angers, were handed a transfer ban by FIFA for violation of regulations regarding relay transfers in August 2020. The ban was effective for the summer 2021 transfer window.

Bahraini investment
In July 2020, a new strategic economic partner joined Paris FC to support the club's development and ambitions: the Kingdom of Bahrain. The deal was completed with a capital investment to improve the finances of the club, giving the kingdom 20 percent of the equity. , the founder of the December 1983 established Alpha Group which owns its subsidiary the consulting and auditing firm Alpha-Secafi, remained the main shareholder with a contribution of 77 percent. In addition to this investment, the Kingdom of Bahrain became the main sponsor of the club.

The Council of Paris was to vote on renewing the yearly subvention that the City of Paris allocates to the Paris Club, several non-profit organizations based in Paris, including ADHRB called for the City of Paris to hold a dialogue on the abuse of human rights and death penalty practiced in the Kingdom of Bahrain, a 20% share holder of the club. The Council of Paris accused the kingdom of distracting the general public from its abuses via a popular sport like football, committing a practice known as ‘sportswashing’. The council also demanded the release of detainees put on death row by Bahrain on the basis of confessions acquired via torture methods. As one of the oldest partners of the Paris FC club, Mairie de Paris was called for pursuing its commitment towards the defense of human rights.

The NGOs had highlighted the human rights records and the sportswashing attempts of Bahrain, under which the club's jerseys promoted “Victorious Bahrain” and the grounds of Charléty stadium had “Explore Bahrain” advertisements. Such publicity was considered inappropriate, as Bahrain was seen as a repressive regime. Following the appeal from the NGOs, the Council of Paris voted an amendment for the allocation of a subsidy of €500,000 to the club. In the amendment, all the issues were kept in mind to ensure the inclusion of an “organization of additional actions to raise awareness of human rights and fight against all forms of discrimination”. Besides, the mention of private financial partnerships in the amendment was believed to prompt a withdrawal of the “Explore Bahrain” advertising panels in the Charléty stadium.

Supporters 
The club used to be the biggest and most well supported in the city, with over 20,000 supporter members at the time of the club's formation.

In 1970 the club merged with Stade Saint-Germain to form Paris Saint-Germain F.C., but quickly left the merger. In the 1973 season, the first after leaving, the club still averaged an attendance of 13,202. However, after that, the two clubs' fortunes varied drastically, and as PSG's popularity rose, PFC fell into obscurity and languished in the amateur divisions. It is only when it reached the third tier its popularity started growing again, however the club currently only attracts in the region of a few hundred to very low thousands fans for each match.

In 2000s the club used to have a supporter group called Blue Wolves founded in 2008. Officially apolitical, they tended to have right-wing views. However they were disbanded in 2010 after several hooligan incidents occurred, the last of which during a match against FC Gueugnon.

They were replaced by the group Old Clan, founded in 2010, and ultras group Ultras Lutetia founded in the summer of 2014. After the expulsion of PSG fans from Parc des Princes in 2010, PFC has attracted some of that support, particularly from the left-wing group Virage Auteuil, but also a few from right-wing group Boulogne Boys.

The fans have a friendship with fans of SR Colmar, in the past also fans of Stade Reims.

The club has rivalries with fellow neighbours US Créteil and Red Star F.C. with whom they contest the Parisian derbies. Although both clubs are officially apolitical, due to Red Star fans left-wing political tendencies and PFC's past right-wing political tendencies, the derby is particularly fierce. The derby with US Créteil is a geographical one as both clubs play in the southern suburbs of Paris.

Current squad

Out on loan

Notable players 
Below are the notable former players who have represented Paris and its predecessors in league and international competition since the club's foundation in 1969. To appear in the section below, a player must have played in at least 80 official matches for the club.

For a complete list of Paris players, see :Category:Paris FC players

 Jean-François Beltramini
 Georges Eo
 Bernard Guignedoux
 Bruno Knockaert
 Jean-Claude Lafargue
 Fabrice Moreau
 Jimmy Modeste
 Paul Orsatti
 Francis Peltier
 Philippe Prieur
 Jean-Luc Rabat
 Pascal Rousseau
 Lamri Laachi
 Omar da Fonseca
 Armand Ossey
 Dragoslav Šekularac

Ownership

Club hierarchy 
As of 1st August 2020

Members of the board 
 Pierre Ferracci
 FINARAMA
 ALTER PARIS
 Association Paris Football Club
 Patrick Gobert
 H.H. Sheikh Khalifa Ali Isa Salman Al-Khalifa
 Abdulla Jehad Abdulla Alzain

Managerial history

Honours

League
 Ligue 2 (second tier)
 Runners-up: 1977–78 (Group B)
Championnat National (third tier)
Runners-up: 2014–15
Championnat National 2/French Division 4 
Winners (1): 2005–06 (Group D)
Runners-up: 1988–89

Notes

References

External links 

 
Association football clubs established in 1969
Football clubs in Paris
1969 establishments in France
13th arrondissement of Paris
Ligue 1 clubs